The Theme of Sirmium was a Byzantine administrative unit (theme), which existed in present-day Serbia, Croatia and Bosnia and Herzegovina in the 11th century. Its capital was Sirmium (today Sremska Mitrovica).

Background
In the 6th century, another Byzantine province existed in this area. It was known as Pannonia and also had its capital in Sirmium, but was much smaller in size.

In the beginning of the 11th century, the area which later became the Theme of Sirmium lay within the borders of the First Bulgarian Empire, under Tsar Samuil and the local duke (voivode) known as Sermon ruled over Sirmium and surrounding area. In a long war, the Byzantine emperor Basil II conquered Bulgaria, and established new Byzantine themes and other local governorates under generals (strategoi) on its territory. The central part of Samuil's realm became the Theme of Bulgaria, the northeastern part the Theme of Paristrion, and the northwestern part became the Theme of Sirmium.

In 1019–20, the bishoprics of Sirmium, Ras and Prizren (roughly corresponding to modern-day Serbia) are mentioned as the westernmost eparchies in the area of the Archbishopric of Ohrid. To the west of these eparchies lay a borderland with ecclesiastical provinces of the Metropolitanate of Dyrrhachium and Catholic bishoprics of maritime cities.

Geography

The exact borders of the Theme of Sirmium are unclear: according to some sources, theme included region of Syrmia (on the northern bank of the Sava river) as well as parts of modern Serbia and Bosnia and Herzegovina on the southern bank of the Sava river, while, according to other sources, it extended along the southern bank of the Danube and along the river Sava.

In this time, the name "Syrmia" was used as a designation for territories on the both banks of the river Sava, while later, designations "Syrmia on this side" (in the north of the Sava river) and "Syrmia on the other side" (in the south of the Sava river) were introduced, until finally, the territory in the south of the Sava river received name "Mačva".

History
After the battle of Manzikert in 1071 and the resulting turmoil in the Byzantine Empire, the Kingdom of Hungary conquered Syrmia, but Byzantine control over the area was restored under the Komnenian emperors. In the last years of the 12th century, Byzantine power waned, and the emergence of the Second Bulgarian Empire created a new contender for the region's control. Eventually, during the 13th and 14th century, the various Serbian states would succeed in control of the region. One of these states, the Kingdom of Syrmia, was centered in the area in which Byzantine Theme of Sirmium existed.

Governors
There were at least three governors, strategoi, that held the theme:
Constantine Diogenes, 1018–29
Theophilos Erotikos, 1040
Ljutovid, fl. 1039–42

See also

Pannonia (Byzantine province)
Realm of Stefan Dragutin

References

Sources

External links

 

History of Syrmia
Medieval history of Vojvodina
11th century in Croatia
Medieval Bosnia and Herzegovina
Sirmium
States and territories established in the 11th century
Medieval Serbia
Byzantine Serbia